Al-Safa Club is a sports club, based in Saudi Arabia, that competes in the Saudi Second Division. The club's headquarters are located in the Safwa City in the Eastern Province, Saudi Arabia near Dammam and  King Fahd International Airport. The facilities of Al-Safa club have been built to the highest standards and include international standard football pitch with an international track and field, swimming pool, indoor volleyball, handball and basketball hall, outdoor tennis, volleyball, handball and basketball courts in addition to a full facility gym and indoor squash courts.

The club competes in ten different sports in Saudi Arabia on the youth and adult levels. These are: Football, Track and field, Handball, Volleyball, Basketball, Squash, Tennis, Table Tennis, Swimming and Bodybuilding. The sports club members have reached highest levels in Saudi Arabia's competitions and have represented the country with the national teams in world cups/ championships and in the Olympic Games.

The club has also multicultural participations in Theatre, Photography, Arts and general training and development.

History
Al-Safa Club was founded in 1947 under the name of "Al-Safa Football Team". And when the Ministry of Interior in Saudi Arabia organized the establishments of sports teams, a special committee visited Safwa city and officially registered the team as a sports club that is officially registered and regulated under the General Presidency of Youth Welfare (GPYF) in Saudi Arabia.

Al-Safa management
Several presidents have been elected to chair the club in the past fifty years. The most famous are:

1- Ahmed Saleh Al-Habib
2- Ali Ahmed Al-Mousa
3- Khoder Al-Ibrahim
4- Sameer Mohammed Al-Nasir (Current President)

Current board members
The current board of directors of the club was elected on November 8, 2015 at the general assembly meeting. The assembly elected the president and eight (8) board members as follows:

Sports accomplishments
Al-Safa Club champions have accomplished several high achievements on the single and team games at the local and international levels. Some of these are listed below

Football
After almost 60 years in the third division, Al-Safa football team was able to win the third division's league in 2011 and qualified to the second division. The team didn't stay long in the second division and was able to qualify to the Saudi's League first division for professionals in 2014 for the first time in History.

Athletics 

In Athletics, Al-Safa Club has produced many champions on the local and international levels. The most famous of them all is the Asian Long Jum record holder Mohammed Al-Khuwalidi who owns the Asian record of 8.48 (List of Asian records in athletics) m in long Jump that he was able to achieve in France in 2006. The other athletics champions who also participated in the World's Championship and/ or the Olympic games include: Asem Al-Hizam in Decathlon, Abdullah Taher in High Jump, Hashim Al-Shorafa in 400 meters and Hussain Asem in Pole Vault

The Saudi records are registered under Al-Safa champions in the following:

Swimming 
In swimming, the most famous Saudi swimmer in history (Alawi Maki) is the dominant figure in the club. Alawi was the first Saudi and Middle Eastern swimming who successfully crossed the English Channel between UK and France. He broke the English Channel crossing record and accompanied him in this achievement the late Saleh Ajaj, Malik Shaker, Fakher Al-Sadah, Saeed Quraish and the current club's vice president Dheya Al-Asaad.

Handball
Al-Safa club is one of Saudi's best teams in Handball. The team has accomplished several advanced positions in the league and club and the team members participated with the Saudi National Team in world cup several times. Among those who participated in the world cup: Hashim Al-Shorafa, Ali AL-Dawood, Bashir Qurainawi, Mohammed Al-Zayer, Hussain Henabi and Mohammed Nasfan.

Volleyball 
Al-Safa club remained for several decades among the best three clubs in volleyball in Saudi (in addition to Al-Ahli and Al-Hilal). Several Team players have participated with the national Saudi team including: Nouri Al-Sadah, Abdulkarim Al-Fraid, Yahya Al-Marhoon and Faiz Al-Dawood.

Squash
In Squash, Al-Safa team is one of the best teams in Saudi Arabia. The players have participated with the national Saudi team in the regional and international competitions. Among those: Fadi Henabi, Akram Al-Safwani, Ali Quraish and Hussain Al-Sadiq

Current squad 

As of Saudi Second Division:

References

Safa
Safa
Safa
Safa